Garlini is an Italian surname. Notable people with the surname include:

Oliviero Garlini (born 1957), Italian footballer
Ruben Garlini (born 1971), Italian footballer

See also
Carlini (name)
Garlin (surname)

Italian-language surnames